Licious  is an Indian instant delivery service, that operates on a farm-to-fork model. It was founded in December 2015 and is based out of Bengaluru. Licious is India's first direct-to-customer unicorn. Licious is India's largest technology (tech)-first full-stacked Direct-to-consumer (D2C) unicorn.

History
Vivek Gupta and his friend, Abhay Hanjura started Licious in 2015. Licious is operated by Delightful Gourmet Pvt. Ltd. Licious operates out of three processing centres in Bengaluru, Mumbai, and Gurugram and is spread in 14 Indian cities. By  third quarter of FY 2022, Licious had generated a revenue of  706 crore, including  16.9 crore as delivery charges. In 2021, Licious became India's 29th unicorn. In October 2022, Licious launched direct-to-consumer, plant-based meat brand, UnCrave. In March 2023, Licious launched a new ad campaign called the ‘All You Can Eat Meat Buffet.’ featuring The Great Khali.

See also
 FreshToHome
 List of online grocers
 List of unicorn startup companies

References

External links

Companies based in Bangalore
Indian companies established in 2013
Online grocers
Online retailers of India